Rainbow cookie or rainbow cake usually refers to a three-layered almond-flavored Italian-American cookie, but can also refer to any of a number of rainbow-colored confections.

Composition
Rainbow cookies are typically composed of layers of brightly colored, almond-based sponge cake (usually almond paste/marzipan), apricot and/or raspberry jam, and a chocolate coating. Commonly referred to as a "cookie," their composition is closer in many ways to a layered cake or petit four. The original rainbow cookie featured layers with colors representing the Italian flag: white, red and green. However, there may be variations in the color of the rainbow cookie's layers, whether for particular holidays, or other events.

History and origins
Rainbow cookies were first introduced by Italian-American bakeries in the late 19th or early 20th Century, and have since spread to other Italian-American and mainstream bakeries. Rainbow cookies are particularly popular at Christmas.

Though many Italian confections have an almond paste or almond flour base, rainbow cookies are a decidedly Italian-American creation. 
 While there is no direct analogue to rainbow cookies in Italy, Italian food historian Mary Taylor Simeti speculates that the Italian-American rainbow cookie is based on the tri-colored gelato di campagna, a nougat with the same colored layers.

Popularity in the Jewish community
Rainbow cookies are popular in the American Jewish community, and are commonly associated with American Jewish cuisine and can be found at many Jewish delis, kosher eateries, and Jewish bakeries throughout the United States, especially in the Northeastern United States.  As Jewish refugees from Eastern Europe settled in New York City en masse at the turn of the 20th century, they often settled in areas that also had an Italian population. It was at this point that Jewish Americans were introduced to the rainbow cookie.

They are a common kiddush cookie served on Shabbat morning and at synagogues across the country. There are also versions of rainbow cookies made for Passover, which are made with matzo meal or almond flour (due to the prohibition of leavening during this holiday).

Jewish Americans adapted this cookie to suit their own Kosher dietary needs, substituting margarine for the butter originally used (making them pareve). Jewish Americans have been credited as being the first to change the original Italian flag design to the more commonly found rainbow design seen today, starting with the changing of the white layer of the cookie to yellow. Other color variations may include blue and white, instead of the traditional rainbow, to celebrate Hanukkah.

Other names
Although often called simply rainbow cookies in much of the continental United States, some local names for this specific variety are:

Napoleon cookies
Seven layer cake
Seven layer cookies
Tricolor/e cookies
Venetian cookies

See also
List of cookies

References

Italian desserts
Italian-American cuisine
Italian-American culture in New York City
Almond desserts
Sponge cakes
Chocolate-covered foods